The Idler was an illustrated monthly magazine published in Great Britain from 1892 to 1911. It was founded by the author Robert Barr, who brought in the humorist Jerome K. Jerome as co-editor, and its contributors included many of the leading writers and illustrators of the time.

Content
The Idler generally catered to the popular taste, printing light pieces and sensational fiction. The magazine published short stories, serialised novels, humour pieces, poetry, memoirs, travel writing, book and theatre reviews, interviews and cartoons. It also included a monthly feature called 'The Idlers' Club,' in which a number of writers would offer their views on a particular topic.

Most of The Idler'''s contributors were popular and prolific writers of the time. Some of them, such as Rudyard Kipling, Mark Twain, and Ernest Bramah, are still read today.

Editors

 February 1892 - July 1895: Jerome Klapka Jerome and Robert Barr
 August 1895 - November 1897: Jerome Klapka Jerome
 1898 - 1901: Arthur Lawrence and Sidney Sime
 1902 - 1911: Robert Barr

Contributors

Writers

 William Livingston Alden
 Robert Barr
 Arthur William Beckett
 Max Beerbohm
 Marie Adelaide Belloc Lowndes as M. A. Belloc
 Aimée Daniell Beringer as Mrs. Oscar Beringer
 Raymond Blathwayt
 Mary Elizabeth Braddon
 Addison Bright
 G. B. Burgin
 Thomas Burke
 Hall Caine
 William Canton
 Albert Chevalier
 Roy Compton
 May Crommelin
 Aleister Crowley
 Guy de Maupassant
 Arthur Conan Doyle
 Archibald Forbes
 Kirby Hare
 H. Rider Haggard
 William Hope Hodgson
 Jerome K. Jerome
 Rudyard Kipling
 Arthur H. Lawrence
 Eliza Lynn Linton
 Katherine Mansfield
 Richard Marsh
 Frank Mathew
 J. F. Nisbet
 Barry Pain
 Joseph Parker
 W. Pett Ridge
 Eden Phillpotts
 Arthur Quiller-Couch
 Lilian Quiller-Couch
 Jean Richepin
 Morley Roberts
 William Clark Russell
 Francis Saltus Saltus
 Evelyn Sharp
 Robert H. Sherard
 George Robert Sims
 Lincoln Springfield
 Mark Twain
 Allen Upward
 Mary Augusta Ward as Mrs Humphry
 H. G. Wells
  Gleeson White
 John Strange Winter
 Israel Zangwill

Artists

 Sydney Adamson
 Frank Barnard
 Lewis Baumer
 Aubrey Beardsley
 Ada Bowley
 Frank Brangwyn
 Dion Clayton Calthrop
 Max Cowper 
 Cynicus (Martin Anderson)
 Archibald Stevenson Forrest (1869 - 1963)
 Florence Fuller
 Florence Briscoe))
 Ernest Goodwin
 James Grieg
 John Gulich
 Hal Hurst
 George Wylie Hutchinson
 Ronald Ian
 Richard Jack
 Ernest Jessop
 J. Kerr Lawson
 H. R. Millar
 John Bernard Partridge
 Charles Pears
 Frederick Pegram
 Melton Prior
 Andrew Scott Rankin
 Robert Sauber
 Sidney Sime
 Penryn Stanley
 Frederic Villiers
 Rob Wagner
 Louis Wain
 John L. Wimbush

References

External links
 Full text online from Project Gutenberg: Vol. 13, February-July 1893.
 Interview with Louis Wain by Roy Compton, originally published in The Idler'' in January 1896 (Vol VIII No. XLVIII.) .
The Idler (1892-1911) - Indexes to Fiction (Victorian Fiction Research Guide)

Monthly magazines published in the United Kingdom
Defunct literary magazines published in the United Kingdom
Magazines established in 1892
Magazines disestablished in 1911